Terence Paul Nutkins (12 August 1946 – 6 September 2012) was an English naturalist, television presenter and author. He appeared in the UK children's programmes Animal Magic, The Really Wild Show, Brilliant Creatures and Growing Up Wild.

Biography
Terry Nutkins was born in Marylebone, London, and spent most of his childhood there. His parents' house overlooked Marylebone station. He skipped school to spend time with the elephants at London Zoo. At the age of twelve, Nutkins went to work in the West Highlands of Scotland, the naturalist Gavin Maxwell having written to London Zoo requesting help from two young assistants to look after otters that he was keeping as pets and studying at his remote home at Sandaig near Glenelg. Nutkins was initially hired for a summer placement, but did not return home and with the permission of his parents he spent several years working and living with Maxwell. He joined Maxwell's long established otter keeper, Jimmy Watt. Maxwell became Nutkins'  legal guardian, and in a Radio 4 documentary Nutkins described living with Maxwell as a "peculiar existence, in virtual isolation, with a man who was as charming as he was difficult, and whose depression led to severe mood swings". Maxwell wrote several books during Nutkins' time there, including the hugely successful Ring of Bright Water in 1960.

At the age of 15, Nutkins lost part of two fingers to one of the otters, named Edal. In the "United Kingdom" episode of the BBC's programme "Deadly 60", Nutkins stated that the otter became aggressive in response to the scent on a jumper that he had been given by a woman that Edal had already attacked and bitten. Edal tore at Nutkins' boot, then attacked his right hand as he reached down, severing the end of his middle finger. As he attempted to control the otter with his other hand, the otter bit his other middle finger and twisted away, severing the end of the other finger.

Nutkins revisited the site of the cottage he shared with Maxwell on the BBC's Countryfile programme in 2010.

In the 1980s, Nutkins was co-presenter of the BBC children's television series Animal Magic with Johnny Morris, whom he describes as his second mentor after Maxwell.  He is perhaps best remembered on the show for segments with Gemini, the California sea lion he had hand-reared from infancy. Animal Magic'''s run ended in 1983 and a year later Nutkins was asked to put together a new animal series, which resulted in The Really Wild Show which he presented from 1986 to 1993. In 1999, he inherited a large portion of Johnny Morris's estate.

Nutkins was part of a consortium which bought Fort Augustus Abbey on the shores of Loch Ness.  They, in turn, sold the abbey to the Santon Group who converted the buildings into apartments known as The Highland Club. 
  
In 2004, he appeared on Living TV's reality television show I'm Famous and Frightened!, and he featured in the 2007 Comic Relief video.
In April 2009, Nutkins co-presented and narrated My Life as an Animal, a BBC Three programme where young professionals and media personalities lived life as animals for four days, sharing living areas, food and sleeping with several farm and zoo animals. Nutkins made an appearance on the BBC's Winterwatch programme (a spin off from Springwatch) talking about how otters had survived the harsh weather in January 2012.

Nutkins was a keen beekeeper and a member of the British Beekeepers' Association. A stone carving of Nutkins was unveiled at the Royal Horticultural Society Show in Tatton Park in 2010.

Death
Nutkins died on 6 September 2012, aged 66. He had been receiving treatment for nine months for acute leukaemia. He died at his home in Glenelg, Scotland, and was survived by his wife and eight children.

BibliographyPets (Factfinders) (with Marshall Corwin) BBC Books (1989) 

Audio book narrationThe Really Wild Animal Tape Listen for Pleasure (1995) Animal Magic: A Jungle Story'' Listen for Pleasure, (1997)

References

External links

Failure to sell Fort Augustus Abbey
Opening of seal sanctuary
Video of Nutkins, Gemini and Johnny Morris on Animal Magic 
Nutkins: I've no time for people who bulls*** with animals

1946 births
2012 deaths
BBC television presenters
British beekeepers
Deaths from cancer in Scotland
British children's television presenters
Deaths from leukemia
English male non-fiction writers
English naturalists
English television presenters
English non-fiction writers
Writers from London